Big Boss Man is an English funk and Latin band formed in 1998 in London, England.  It consists of Nasser Bouzida a.k.a. "The Bongolian" on organs, percussion and vocals, Badger Burgess on bass guitar, Trevor Harding on electric guitar and Desmond Rogers on drums.

Formation and early years 
Nasser Bouzida, was brought up in Harlow, England, but his formative years were spent in Newbury, Berkshire. He always had a strong love for Latin music. When he was a teenager, Nasser liked composing mini rock-operas in the style of Showaddywaddy. When he was in his early twenties he appeared on the low-budget cable TV show Jenny Powell's Hot, due to him becoming a pioneer of the sports-casual movement. On the set of this show he first met the band Bloodvessel, one of whom was Trevor Harding. A quote from their website describes the pair:

Bouzida and Harding soon formed an unbreakable bond through their love of the Portsmouth Sea life centre and Roxy Music. After witnessing a life-changing gig by world music surrealists Bandanna at the now infamous Bedford Arms, the two formed Espadrille. Their first big break came when Sea Link offered them a glamorous five show per day three-month contract, including two free hot meals per day and unlimited access to the mini-bar. On one particularly choppy entertainment voyage, the duo bumped into Coffin Nails' tattooed psycho dog-man "Mad-Man" Scott Milsom and indie sex-fiend / owner of Europe's thinnest ears; Nick Nichols.

In the first half of 1999, the band played a gig at the Blow Up when it was situated at the Wag club in Soho, London. According to the band's website they were loved by the crowd, which had filled the club to capacity as was normal:

as usual the club was packed and the crowd absolutely loved the Big Boss Sound. They were then immediately signed up to the club's very own Blow Up record label.

Afterwards, the band made their first release, as part of the V2 Blow Up compilation Blow Up A Go-Go with the demo version of the track "Humanize," recorded in the band's very own Ramshackle studios. This track was then re-recorded and released as the title track on the band's own debut album.

In 2000, the band appeared in and wrote the soundtrack for the short comedy film Sweet. This film starred the UK comedy duo The Mighty Boosh (Julian Barratt and Noel Fielding), who were awarded the Perrier Best Newcomers award of Edinburgh Festival. As well as providing the soundtrack, the band are in the film in the club scenes and as extras in the bar scenes.  November 2000 also saw the inclusion of "Xmas BOOGALOO" on the compilation album It's A Cool, Cool Christmas.

"Sea Groove"
In September 2000, Big Boss Man released their first single, "Sea Groove" (named possibly due to the chance encounter between the four members on a ferry). This was part of Blow Up's new series of 7" records called Blow Up 45's. SELECT magazine gave the single a good review, alongside such artists as Eminem, Coldplay and Fat Boy Slim. The release was marked by a show at a Blow Up club event celebrating the opening of the "My Generation" Fashion and Photography Exhibition in Stockholm.

Humanize
Big Boss Man's debut album, Humanize, featuring the singles "Sea Groove," "Big Boss Man" and "Sell Your Soul" was released in April 2001. The sound has been described on their website as “a hip heavy Hammond hybrid of pop, 6T's R'n'B / Latin soul and funk”.
The album is largely instrumental, with the exception of the songs "Humanize," "Big Boss Man," "Money" and "Sell Your Soul. Of these, "Big Boss Man" and "Sell Your Soul" are the only two which follow a standard structure of verse/chorus etc., while the other two merely have a phrase repeated throughout the song.

In May 2001, Later magazine gave away 100,000 copies of a compilation CD called The Later Lounge which featured kitsch classics from the 1960s and '70s. Big Boss Man had the honour of being the only contemporary act featured on the CD with their track "Party 7." They were alongside such acts as James Clarke, Grant Green, Herbie Hancock, Paul Nero, and Hugo Montenegro.

In December 2001, the Later released a compilation CD entitled The Later Lounge 2, featuring the band's debut single "Sea Groove."

In 2006 "Party 7" was featured in one of a number of advertisements for Nike's FIFA 2006 World Cup advertisement campaign. The advertisement was entitled "Henry" and featured Thierry Henry and Eric Cantona. Coincidentally, the UK BBC coverage of the 2006 FIFA World Cup Final featured "Party 7." Blow Up records reissued the Humanize album in 2006, with stickers on the sleeve with reference to the ad.

In 2002, after the release of Humanize, the band decided to tour Europe to promote it. The dates included three weeks in Spain, two weeks in Germany, then travelling to Moscow and Venice and finishing up with two weeks in France including the Le Rock Dans Tousses Etats festival in Evreux where they played to 10,000 people.

Big Boss Man returned from Europe and continued to tour around England and Scotland. They were also asked to rework and remix tracks for Japanese sensation Mansfield for his Golden Hour album, and reworked Ingfried Hoffmann's 1960s/70s Euro-cult TV theme "Robbi, Tobbi und das Fliewatüüt" for an EP released on Germany's Diggler Records.

2003 
Big Boss Man returned to Europe and headlined nights at the Aucard de Tours festival and Cosmic Trip festival. They then had a two-week tour of Spain, took in headline cult festival slots and club gigs, and ended the tour on a high note with a sell-out show at Madrid's Sala Caracol venue.

2004 
Paul Weller released a single called "The Bottle", which Big Boss Man dutifully remixed. Weller's single went straight in to the UK top 20. Two special limited edition versions of this single (vocal and instrumental) were released and it fast became a collectors item.  Later the same year, Coca-Cola France requested the band's permission to use their second single "Big Boss Man" for promotional use. In May the band flew to France to play Cosmic Groove parties in Paris and Montpellier and in July, they touched down in Italy to play Festival Beat. Nasser Bouzida then toured Spain with a live revue of his spin-off solo album The Bongolian and was asked to guest with Woodstock's Country Joe and the Fish and 1960s British mod soul band The Action.

Winner 
Big Boss Man released their second album, Winner, in April 2005. The album had a subtly different feel to the first record, due to its more apparent Latin feel, although the base elements of funk, jazz and soul are all still there, as are the cool sounds of the Hammond organ. No singles were released from the album. However, "Kelvin Stardust," the first track of Winner, was included on the Soulshaker Volume 2 compilation album released by Blow Up Records in July of that year.

To further differentiate from Humanize, the album featured more vocals (although still mostly instrumental) with four songs ("Fall In Fall Out," "Complicated Lady," "Reach Out" and "Got It So Bad") now sporting full lyrics. Winner also features some French vocals in the song "Tu as Gache Mon Talent Ma Cherie;" in true Big Boss Man style, the only lyrics are those in the title of the song. This French number was written possibly due to their large fan base in France, where Winner garnered wide radio play.

To promote Winner, Big Boss Man embarked on a 12 date tour of France in the spring. They also returned to Spain for a 16 date autumn tour, including a second national TV appearance on the Spanish television show Radio 3. Possibly related to this, at the end of the song "Jackson 16," there appears to be a clip from either a Spanish radio or TV show.

Club favourite "The Hawk," the 11th track from Winner, was included on Come On Soul, an international compilation of vintage and contemporary dance floor tracks released by the Legre record label in Hamburg in 2008.

Full English Beat Breakfast 
Full English Beat Breakfast, released in September 2009, is by far the band's most ambitious project yet, using more synthesisers than previously, showing the boys are still writing good songs as proved with "C'est Moi."

Last Man on Earth 
Last Man On Earth, released September 2014 is the fourth album from Big Boss Man: 15 new recordings available on 180g heavy-weight vinyl LP, CD and digital.

The band take a fresh approach to the BBM sound - their hip hybrid of Latin, jazz, soul, psych rock and 1960s/'70s drenched R&B is now expanded with the added dimension of a brass section and guest vocalists adding to the further sonic and rhythmic explorations from the band, taking us on one heck of a brand new trip!

It includes the single "Aardvark," a jazz dance floor filler, rush released fresh from the studio mix sessions in April, that received strong radio support from BBC 6 Music and BBCRadio 2, including multiple spins by Craig Charles on his Funk and Soul Show, who declared that "I've been a big fan of Big Boss Man for many years. Big Boss Man 'Aardvark'. Double Groovy!" Additional radio plays came also from Cerys Matthews, Gideon Coe, Tom Ravenscroft, Chris Hawkins and Huey Morgan at the stations.

Discography

Albums 
Humanize (2001)
Winner (2005)
Full English Beat Breakfast (2009)
Last Man on Earth (2014)

Singles 
"Sea Groove" (2000)
"Big Boss Man" (2001)
"Sell Your Soul" (2002)
"Party 7 / Kelvin Stardust" (2006)
"Black Eye (I believed in love)" (2009)
"C'Est Moi" (2010)
"Aardvark" (2014)

References

English funk musical groups
Latin music groups
Musical groups established in 1998